General Sir George de Lacy Evans  (7 October 1787 – 9 January 1870) was a British Army general who served in four wars in which the United Kingdom's troops took part in the 19th century. He was later a long-serving Member of Parliament.

Life
Evans was born in 1787, in Moig, County Limerick, Ireland. Educated at Woolwich Academy he followed his elder brother Richard (1782–1847) into the military, joining the East India Company's forces in 1800 before volunteering for the British Army in India in 1806. He obtained an ensigncy in the 22nd Regiment of Foot in 1807 then exchanged into the 3rd Light Dragoons in order to take part in the Peninsular War. He was sent on the expedition to the United States of 1814 during the War of 1812 under Major General Robert Ross. Evans was quartermaster general to Ross at the Battle of Bladensburg on 24 August 1814, and during the Burning of Washington, as well as at the Battle of North Point on 12 September 1814, where Ross was killed.

Evans was actively involved in the New Orleans campaign at the conclusion of the War of 1812. He was the only British Army officer present at the Royal Navy 'small boat action' on Lake Borgne, and was wounded at the battle of New Orleans.

Returning to the European war with the restoration of Emperor Napoleon I, Evans was present at the battle of Quatre Bras on 16 June 1815 and the battle of Waterloo on 18 June 1815.

Although he had no personal experience in Central Asia, Evans became increasingly concerned that Russia had designs on India posing a threat of an attack through Central Asia. He wrote two books, “On the Designs of Russia” (1828) and “On the Practicability of an Invasion of British India” (1829). highlighting this threat. These books were influential in persuading Edward Law, 1st Earl of Ellenborough, President of the Board of Control of India, to gather intelligence from all sources, including sending out young officers to explore the possible invasions routes into India, as part of the Great Game.

Evans commanded the British Legion, which volunteered to assist Isabella II of Spain in the First Carlist War (1833-1840). During the Crimean War he commanded the 2nd Division of the British Army.

In 1853 he was given the colonelcy for life of the 21st Regiment of Foot (Royal North British Fusiliers) and promoted full general on 10 March 1861.

He served as a Member of Parliament (MP) for Rye in 1830, and from 1831 to 1832, and for Westminster from 1833 to 1841 and from 1846 to 1865.  He was also awarded the Grand Cross of the French Legion of Honour.

In 1854, Evans was appointed to command the 2nd Division at the start of the Crimean war, and fought at the Battle of the Alma. Around the time of the Battle of Inkerman, he was sick, so Major General John Pennefather was in command of the division. He was later invalided home.

Beginning in the middle 1850s Evans became a strong advocate for reform of the British army. In particular he was harshly critical of the system by which British army officers purchased their commissions and were expected to pay for each rank of promotion. While he did not live to see the final abolition of the purchase system which occurred in 1871, his persistent call for amelioration was instrumental in its ultimate demise.

Evans died on 9 January 1870, and is buried in Kensal Green Cemetery, London.

Portraits of Evans were painted by Peter Edward Stroehling (above) and Richard Buckner. An engraving based on the latter can be seen on the web site of the British Library, London. The original life-size Buckner portrait was rediscovered in 2012 and was authenticated by art historian Philip Mould on the BBC Antiques Road Show at Cheltenham in 2013.

Sir George de Lacy Evans's medals and awards are on display at the Queens Own Royal Hussars Museum located in the Lord Leycester Hospital in Warwick.

Arms

References

Sources

Adkin, Mark (2001). The Waterloo Companion. Aurum. 
Barbero, Alessandro (2005). The Battle: A New History of Waterloo. Atlantic Books. 
 George, Christopher T., Terror on the Chesapeake: The War of 1812 on the Bay, Shippensburg, Pa., White Mane, 2001, 
Spiers, Edward M (1983). Radical General : Sir George de Lacy Evans, 1787–1870, Manchester, U.K., Manchester University Press, 

de Lacy Evans' grave at historyhome.co.uk

Further reading
 Brett, Edward M. The British Auxiliary Legion in the First Carlist War 1835–1838: A Forgotten Army. Dublin: Four Courts Press, 2005.
 Bullen, Roger and Strong, Felicity (Eds.). Prime Minister Papers Series I. Palmerston: Private Correspondence with Sir George Villiers (afterwards 4th Earl of Clarendon) as Minister to Spain 1833–1837. London: Royal Commission of Historical Manuscripts, HMSO, 1985.
 Coverdale, John F. The Basque Phase of Spain's First Carlist War. Princeton: Princeton University Press, 1984.
 De Porras y Rodríguez de León, Gonzalo. La Expedición de Rodil y las Legiones Extranjeras en la Primera Guerra Carlista. Madrid: Ministerio de Defensa, 2004.
 Duncan, Francis. The English in Spain: The Story of the War of Succession between 1834 and 1840. London: John Murray, 1877.
 Evans, Sir George De Lacy. Memoranda of the Contest in Spain. London: James Ridgway, 1840.
 Holt, Edgar. The Carlist Wars in Spain. Chester Springs (Pennsylvania): Dufour Editions, 1967.
 Pirala, Antonio. Historia de la Guerra Civil. Madrid: Turner SA / Historia 16, 1984. (6 Volumes).
 Rodriguez, Moises Enrique. Under the Flags of Freedom: British Mercenaries in the War of the Two Brothers, the First Carlist War and the Greek War of Independence (1821–1840). Lanham (Maryland): Hamilton Books, 2009.
 Shaw, Charles. Personal Memoirs & Correspondence of Col. Charles Shaw, comprising a Narrative of the War for Constitutional Liberty in Portugal and Spain. London: Henry Colburn Publishers, 1837. (2 Volumes).
 Shelley, Ronald G. The British Legion in Spain during the First Carlist War. Brighton: Spanish Philatelic Society, 1975.
 Somerville, Alexander. History of the British Legion and the War in Spain 1835–1837. London: James Pattie, 1839.
 Spiers, Edward M. Radical General: Sir George de Lacy Evans 1787–1870. Manchester: Manchester University Press, 1983.

External links

 

|-

1787 births
1870 deaths
Military personnel from County Limerick
Liberal Party (UK) MPs for English constituencies
British Army generals
British Army personnel of the Napoleonic Wars
British Army personnel of the War of 1812
British Army personnel of the Crimean War
UK MPs 1831–1832
UK MPs 1832–1835
UK MPs 1835–1837
UK MPs 1837–1841
UK MPs 1841–1847
UK MPs 1847–1852
UK MPs 1852–1857
UK MPs 1857–1859
UK MPs 1859–1865
Burials at Kensal Green Cemetery
Knights Grand Cross of the Order of the Bath
Graduates of the Royal Military Academy, Woolwich
3rd The King's Own Hussars officers
West India Regiment officers
Cheshire Regiment officers
British Auxiliary Legion personnel
Grand Croix of the Légion d'honneur